Protein Wnt-11 is a protein that in humans is encoded by the WNT11 gene.

The WNT gene family consists of structurally related genes that encode secreted signaling proteins. These proteins have been implicated in oncogenesis and in several developmental processes, including regulation of cell fate and patterning during embryogenesis. This gene is a member of the WNT gene family. It encodes a protein showing 97%, 85%, and 63% amino acid identity with mouse, chicken, and Xenopus Wnt11 protein, respectively. This gene plays roles in the development of bones, kidneys , and lungs, and is associated with early onset osteoporosis.

References

Further reading